The Philippines have dominated the men's events since the sport was played, winning 18 of the 21 events. Malaysia won 13 of the 20 women's events.

Starting in 2019, the 3x3 version of the game was played, in addition to the usual 5-on-5 full strength teams.

Men's tournaments

5-on-5

Medal summary

3x3

Medal summary

Women's tournaments

5-on-5

Medal summary

3x3

Medal summary

Combined medal summary

Note
* The 2005 men's basketball tournaments were originally scheduled to be held at the Ynares Center in Antipolo Province of Rizal, while the women's tournaments were to be held at the Blue Eagle Gym in Quezon City. Both Final Games were to be held at the Araneta Coliseum in Quezon City.

See also
Southeast Asia Basketball Association
Basketball at the Asian Games
FIBA Asia Championship
Basketball at the West Asian Games

References

 
Southeast Asian Games
Southeast Asian Games